Edmond Farrell Conn (March 18, 1914 – December 24, 1998) was an American farmer, businessman, and politician.

Conn was born in Alden, Freeborn County, Minnesota. Conn was a farmer and a businessman. He lived in Alden, Minnesota. Conn was involved with the insurance, farm loans, livestock, and real estate businesses. Conn also served on the local school board. He served in the Minnesota House of Representatives from 1957 to 1962 and was a Democrat.

References

1914 births
1998 deaths
People from Freeborn County, Minnesota
Businesspeople from Minnesota
Farmers from Minnesota
School board members in Minnesota
Democratic Party members of the Minnesota House of Representatives